Oļegs Šļahovs or Oleg Shliakhov (born 8 September 1973) is a Latvian pair skater. He competed with Elena Berezhnaya from 1992 to 1996. They enjoyed some success, placing eighth at the 1994 Winter Olympics. Their partnership ended after a side-by-side camel spin went bad and Shliakhov's blade cut into Berezhnaya's head. After that, Šļahovs teamed up with Elena Sirokhvatova, with whom he placed 20th at the 1997 World Championships.

Results

With Berezhnaya

With Sirokhvatova

References 

Figure skaters at the 1994 Winter Olympics
Olympic figure skaters of Latvia
Latvian male pair skaters
1973 births
Living people
Competitors at the 1994 Goodwill Games